The Overlanders were a British music group active during the 1960s.

Career
Originally playing folk songs, the band found success hard to come by during the beat era and so converted to a more mainstream sound. In 1964, they had a regional hit in the Chicago area of the United States, and in Australia, with a cover of "Don't It Make You Feel Good", a song written and recorded by The Shadows in UK. That same year, their rendition of Chad Stuart's "Yesterday's Gone" received much airplay in the US and became a minor hit.

Although they released twelve singles on the Pye record label between 1963 and 1966, the Overlanders' only British hit was a cover version of the Beatles' "Michelle". It reached number 1 on the Record Retailer chart (subsequently the UK Singles Chart) in January 1966 and beat off a rival recording by David and Jonathan, whose version was produced by George Martin and featured arrangements by Tony Hatch.

A collection of complete recordings, titled  Michelle: The Pye Anthology, was released on CD by Castle Records in 2001.

Personnel
The original trio were:
 Paul Arnold – lead guitar, vocals (born Paul Arnold Friswell, 18 August 1942, Bretford, Rugby, Warwickshire)
 Laurie Mason – piano, percussion, vocals (born 1 November 1940, Middlesbrough, North Yorkshire)
 Peter Bartholomew – guitar, vocals (born 20 May 1941, Andover, Hampshire)

This line-up was augmented in concert by:
 Rick Wild – vocals, keyboards (born in West Yorkshire)
 Alan Warran – drums
 Terry Widlake – bass (born Harry Terence Widlake, 21 April 1942, Birmingham, Staffordshire)
 Paul Russell - first drummer of band, joined same time as Terry Widlake, was drummer for approx a year, leaving in January 1966.
Both Widlake and Russell came from "the Sherwoods"
 Brian Middleditch – original drummer 
 David Banks – drums
 David Walsh – drums (born 10 August 1947, Birmingham, Staffordshire)
 David "Kip" Stewart – guitar
 Andy Scarisbrick – guitar
When Arnold left in late 1966 to pursue a solo career, he was replaced by Ian Griffiths. Widlake left in 1968, and was replaced by Mike Wedgwood (born 19 May 1950, in Derby, Derbyshire).

Rick Wild kept the band touring, and are currently based in Huddersfield, West Yorkshire. Occasional bass and drum deputies are undertaken by Barry Kingsbeer (bass) and Wal Freeman (drums) of The Establishment from Nuneaton and Coventry.

References

External links
  Photo and discography
 [ Biography at Allmusic.com]
 

British folk music groups